The 2021 President of the Chamber of Deputies of Brazil election took place on 1 February 2021, the day after the opening day of the 3rd Session of the 56th Legislature of the National Congress.

Incumbent President Rodrigo Maia can't run for re-election due to term limits.

Deputy Arthur Lira (PP-AL) won Baleia Rossi (MDB-SP) with 302 votes over 145 votes on Rossi and 56 other votes.

Candidates

Confirmed candidates
 André Janones (AVANTE-MG) Federal Deputy from Minas Gerais since 2019.
 Arthur Lira (PP-AL) - Federal Deputy from Alagoas since 2011; State Deputy of Alagoas 1999–2011; City Councillor of Maceió 1993–1999.
 Baleia Rossi (MDB-SP) - Federal Deputy from São Paulo since 2015; National President of the Brazilian Democratic Movement since 2019.
 Fábio Ramalho (MDB-MG) - Federal Deputy from Minas Gerais since 2011; First Vice President of the Chamber of Deputies 2017–2019; Mayor of Malacacheta 1997–2005; candidate for President of the Chamber in 2016 and 2019.
 Kim Kataguiri (DEM-SP) - Federal Deputy from São Paulo since 2019.
 Luiza Erundina (PSOL-SP) - Federal Deputy since 1999; Minister of the Federal Administration 1993; Mayor of São Paulo 1989–93; State Deputy of São Paulo 1987–89; City Councillor of São Paulo 1983–87; candidate for President of the Chamber in 2016 and 2017; candidate for Mayor of São Paulo in 1996, 2000, 2004 and 2016.
 Marcel van Hattem (NOVO-RS) - Federal Deputy from Rio Grande do Sul since 2019; State Deputy of Rio Grande do Sul 2015–18; City Councillor of Dois Irmãos 2005–09; candidate for President of the Chamber in 2019.
 Roberto Peternelli (PSL-SP) - Federal Deputy from São Paulo since 2019; candidate for President of the Chamber in 2019.

Withdrawn candidates
 Alessandro Molon (PSB-RJ) - Federal Deputy from Rio de Janeiro since 2011; Chamber PSB Leader since 2020; Chamber Opposition Leader 2019–2020; State Deputy of Rio de Janeiro 2003–2011.
 Alexandre Frota (PSDB-SP) - Federal Deputy from São Paulo since 2019.
 Aguinaldo Ribeiro (PP-PB) - Federal Deputy from Paraíba since 2011; Minister of Cities 2012–2014; State Deputy of Paraíba 2003–2011.
 Carlos Zarattini (PT-SP) - Federal Deputy from São Paulo since 2007; State Deputy of São Paulo 1999–2003; City Councillor of São Paulo 1995–96, 2001–02.
 Augusto Rosa (PL-SP) - Federal Deputy from São Paulo since 2015.
 Elmar Nascimento (DEM-BA) - Federal Deputy from 2015; State Deputy of Bahia 2003–15.
 Fábio Faria (PSD-RN) - Minister of Communications since 2020; Federal Deputy from Rio Grande do Norte since 2007.
 Fernando Coelho Filho (DEM-PE) - Federal Deputy from Pernambuco since 2007; Minister of Mines and Energy 2016–18.
 Gleisi Hoffmann (PT-PR) - Federal Deputy from Paraná since 2019; National Chair of the Workers' Party since 2017; Senator for Paraná 2011–19; Chief of Staff of the Presidency 2011–14; Chief Financial Office of Itaipu Binacional 2003–06; Municipal Secretary of Public Management of Londrina 2001–03; State Secretary of Administrative Restructuring 1999–2000
 Luciano Bivar (PSL-PE) - Federal Deputy from Pernambuco since 2019, 2017–18, 1993–2003; 2nd Vice President of the Chamber of Deputies since 2019; National Chair of the Social Liberal Party since 2018; 1998–2018.
 Marcelo Freixo (PSOL-RJ) - Federal Deputy from Rio de Janeiro since 2019; State Deputy of Rio de Janeiro 2007–19; candidate for President of the Chamber in 2019.
 Marcelo Ramos (PL-AM) - Federal Deputy from Amazonas since 2019; State Deputy of Amazonas 2011–2015; City Councillor of Manaus 2007–2011.
 Marcos Pereira (REP-SP) - Federal Deputy from São Paulo since 2019; First Vice President of the Chamber of Deputies since 2019; Minister of Industry, Foreign Trade and Services 2016–2018.
 Soraya Santos (PL-RJ) - Federal Deputy from Rio de Janeiro since 2015.
 Tereza Cristina (DEM-MS) - Minister of Agriculture, Livestock and Supply since 2019; Federal Deputy from Mato Grosso do Sul since 2015; State Secretary of Agrarian Development, Production, Industry, Trade and Tourism of Mato Grosso do Sul 2007–14.

Endorsements

Predictions

Formal voting

References

2021 elections in Brazil
Elections in Brazil
President of the Chamber of Deputies of Brazil elections